The West Branch Brandywine Creek is a  tributary of Brandywine Creek in Chester County, Pennsylvania in the United States.

The West Branch Brandywine Creek is born near the community of Honey Brook.  It later joins with the East Branch Brandywine Creek in the community of Lenape to form Brandywine Creek.

The Embreeville Historic District straddles the West Branch Brandywine Creek in Newlin Township.

See also
List of rivers of Pennsylvania

References

External links
U.S. Geological Survey: PA stream gaging stations
Photo or origin of west branch of Branydwine Creek

Rivers of Pennsylvania
Tributaries of the Christina River
Rivers of Chester County, Pennsylvania